The Temple Owls are an American collegiate basketball team based in Philadelphia representing Temple University. They play in the American Athletic Conference.

There have been 18 head coaches for the Owls, including two Basketball Hall of Fame inductees – Harry Litwack and John Chaney. The Owls play their home games at Liacouras Center in Philadelphia and are one of the original collegiate team members of the Philadelphia Big 5, along with Philadelphia collegiate rivals St. Joseph's, Penn, Villanova and LaSalle.



Key

Gallery

Coaches

''Note: Statistics are correct through the end of the 2020–21 NCAA basketball season.

References

Lists of college men's basketball head coaches in the United States

Temple Owls basketball coaches